Rolley Lake Provincial Park is a provincial park in British Columbia, Canada. It is located on Rolley Lake in the Stave Falls area of Mission, British Columbia. The area was inhabited by the Sto:lo people, homesteaded in 1888 by James and Fanny Rolley, and later used for logging operations.

Rolley Lake has a day-use area, camping site, and two popular hiking trails. Rolley Lake trail circles the lake, and is an easy 3-km loop. Rolley Falls hike is a 2.5-km out-and-back trail that starts at the campsite and leads to nearby waterfalls.

Climate
Rolley Lake has an oceanic climate (Köppen climate type Cfb).

References

External links

Mission, British Columbia
Provincial parks of British Columbia
1961 establishments in British Columbia
Protected areas established in 1961